Pterostylis rogersii, commonly known as the curled-tongue shell orchid, is a species of orchid endemic to the south-west of Western Australia. As with similar orchids, the flowering plants differ from those which are not flowering. The non-flowering plants have a rosette of leaves but the flowering plants lack a rosette and have a single flower with leaves on the flowering spike. This greenhood usually has a white and reddish-brown striped flower with a long, curved labellum and is found along the south coast between Binningup and Esperance.

Description
The flowers are white with reddish-brown or less commonly green stripes. The dorsal sepal and petals are fused, forming a hood or "galea" over the column, the dorsal sepal curving forward with a sharp pointed tip. Between their bases there is a deep, V-shaped sinus. Flowering occurs from June to August.

Taxonomy and naming
Pterostylis rogersii was first formally described in 1930 by Edith Coleman and the description was published in The Victorian Naturalist from specimens collected between Bunbury and Collie. The specific epithet (rogersii) honours Richard Rogers "because the new species is abundant and beautiful".

Distribution and habitat
The curled-tongue shell orchid is found in a narrow coastal strip between Binningup and Esperance in the Esperance Plains, Jarrah Forest, Swan Coastal Plain and Warren biogeographic regions.

Conservation
Pterostylis rogersii is classified as "not threatened" by the Western Australian Government Department of Parks and Wildlife.

References

rogersii
Endemic orchids of Australia
Orchids of Western Australia
Plants described in 1933